The Telemark Canal connects the towns Skien and Dalen in southern Norway by linking several long lakes in the Skien watershed through a series of 18 locks.

It originally consisted of two canals. The Norsjø–Skien Canal, with locks in Skien and Løveid, was built in 1854–1861 and linked Skien with Norsjø lake. The longer Bandak–Norsjø Canal was opened in 1892 by the Minister of Labour Hans Hein Theodor Nysom. It extended the canal from Norsjø lake through Flåvatn and Kviteseidvatn (Kviteseidvatnet) lakes to Bandak lake. In Europe, this canal was seen as "the eighth wonder" at the time it was finished. The Bandak–Nordsjø Canal was mainly built for transport of goods and passengers, log floating and to prevent flooding. Log floating is no longer practiced, due to the closing of Union, a local paper factory.  An eastern section gives access from Norsjø lake to Notodden via Lake Heddalsvatnet.

The riverboats Henrik Ibsen and Victoria travel with tourists from Skien to Dalen via Kviteseid. Victoria has traveled the Norsjø–Skien Canal since 1882, and the Bandak–Norsjø Canal since its opening.

The canal was selected as the millennium site for Telemark county. It was also features in the Telemarkskanalen – minutt for minutt slow television documentary in 2012.

The Bandak-Norsjø Canal was made a National Cultural Heritage in June, 2017.

List of lock chambers
There are 18 lock chambers at 8 different locations.

Maximum traffic dimensions

References

External links
The Telemark Canal

Geography of Vestfold og Telemark
Tourist attractions in Vestfold og Telemark
Canals in Norway
Locks in Norway
Water transport in Vestfold og Telemark
Nome, Norway
Kviteseid
Canals opened in 1861
Canals opened in 1892
Timber rafting
1861 establishments in Norway
Millennium sites